Beside Still Waters is an American comedy-drama film co-written, produced, and directed by actor Chris Lowell in his directorial debut. The film was released on November 14, 2014.

Plot
In the wake of his parents' deaths and about to sell their summer home, Daniel has one final weekend with his friends, reality TV star James, recently unemployed Tom, Martin and his wife Abby, Charley, and Daniel's ex-girlfriend Olivia and her fiancé Henry.

Cast
 Ryan Eggold as Daniel
 Britt Lower as Olivia
 Brett Dalton as James
 Reid Scott as Henry
 Beck Bennett as Tom
 Will Brill as Martin
 Jessy Hodges as Charley
 Erin Darke as Abby

Production
The film was shot in Petoskey, Michigan.

Release
Beside Still Waters had its world premiere at the 36th Mill Valley Film Festival on October 12, 2013. The film screened at the Austin Film Festival on October 26, 2013 (where it won the Jury Prize and the Audience Award), and the Atlanta Film Festival on March 29, 2014.  It opened the Sonoma Film Festival on April 2, 2014. On August 20, 2014, it was announced that Tribeca Film bought the film and had set a limited theatrical release date for November 14, 2014, and a VOD release date of November 18, 2014.

References

External links
 
 
 

2013 films
2013 comedy-drama films
American comedy-drama films
Films set in Michigan
Films shot in Michigan
American independent films
2013 directorial debut films
2013 independent films
2010s English-language films
2010s American films